The following railroad lines were owned or operated by the Pennsylvania Railroad west of Pittsburgh and Erie.

Pittsburgh to Chicago
Main Line (Pittsburgh to Chicago)
Economy Branch (Baden)
Block House Run Branch (New Brighton)
North Rochester Branch (Rochester)
Marginal Branch (Beaver Falls)
Oil Street Branch (Beaver Falls)
South Canton Branch (Canton)
Buck Hill Branch (Canton)
South Massillon Branch (Massillon)
Massillon and Cleveland Branch (Massillon Junction to Clinton)
Walhonding Branch (Loudonville to Coshocton)
Rocky Fork Branch (Mansfield)
Toledo Branch (Toledo Junction to Detroit)
Water Street Branch (Toledo)
River Branch (Toledo)
Oakman Branch (Dearborn)
West Belt Branch (Dearborn to Highland Park)
Grand Rapids Branch (Fort Wayne to Mackinaw City)
Muskegon Branch (Grand Rapids to Muskegon)
Missaukee Branch (Missakuee Junction to Michelson)
Traverse City Branch (Walton Junction to Traverse City)
Harbor Springs Branch (Kegomic to Harbor Springs)
State Line and Indiana City Railway (Clarke Junction to State Line)
Wolf Lake Branch (Hammond)
Hammond Branch (Hammond to Hegewisch)
South Chicago and Southern Railroad (Colehour to Bernice)
Calumet River Line (South Chicago to Hegewisch)
Cummings Branch (South Chicago)
Calumet Western Railway (South Chicago to Hegewisch)
Cleveland Line (Rochester to Cleveland)
Beaver Valley Railroad Branch (Vanport)
River Branch (Yellow Creek to Bellaire)
Wheeling Terminal Branch (Martins Ferry to Benwood)
POV&C Railroad Branch (Bellaire to Krebs Run)
Wegee Branch (Wegee to Webb)
Salineville Railroad (Salineville)
Canton-Bayard Branch (Bayard to Fairhope)
Tuscarawas Branch (Bayard to Goshen)
Brush Run Branch (Magnolia)

Marietta Branch (Dover to Marietta)
Strasburg Branch (Dover to Parral)
Akron Branch (Hudson to Columbus)
Dresden Branch (Killbuck to Trinway)
Howard Branch (Howard to Millwood)
Maple Heights Industrial Branch (Maple Heights to Cleveland)
Kingsbury Branch (Cleveland)
Silver Plate Branch (Cleveland)

New Brighton to Ashtabula Harbor
Kenwood Branch (New Brighton)
Beaver Valley Branch (Homewood Junction to Wampum Junction)
Mahoningtown Branch (New Castle Junction to New Castle)
Erie and Pittsburgh Branch (New Castle to Erie)
Sharpsville Branch (Sharpsville)
New Castle Branch (New Castle to Stoneboro)
Wilmington Branch (Wilmington Junction to New Wilmington)
Wolf Creek Branch (Leesburg to Redmond)
Bessemer Branch (Coverts to Walford)
Canfield Branch (Haselton)
Alliance Branch (Niles to Alliance)
Sandusky Branch (Sandusky to Columbus)

Pittsburgh to St. Louis
Main Line (Pittsburgh, PA to St. Louis, MO)
Ohio Connecting Railway (Woods Run, Pittsburgh to Elliott, Pittsburgh)

Duffs Branch (Esplen, Pittsburgh to Thornburg)
Sheridan Branch (Esplen, Pittsburgh to Elliott, Pittsburgh)
Chartiers Branch (Carnegie to Washington)
Bridgeville and McDonald Branch (Bridgeville to Cecil)
Westland Branch (Houston to Westland)
Palanka Branch (Houston to Palanka)
Burgetts Branch (Burgettstown to Valear)
Hickory Branch (Burgettstown to Cherry Valley)
Langeloth Branch (Valear to Studa)
New Cumberland Branch (Weirton Junction to Kobuta)
Wheeling Branch (Weirton Junction to Benwood)
Cadiz Branch (Cadiz Junction to Cadiz)
Georgetown Branch (Lando to Georgetown)
Zanesville Branch (Trinway to Morrow)
Mill Run Branch (Zanesville)

Springfield Branch (Xenia to Springfield)
C&X Branch (Xenia, OH to Cincinnati, OH)
Middletown Branch (Middletown Junction, OH to Middletown, OH)
Undercliff Branch (Rendcomb Junction, OH to Cincinnati, OH)

Richmond Branch (Oakley, OH to Anoka, IN)
Fort Wayne Branch (Richmond, IN to Adams Township of Allen County, IN)
Lebanon Branch (Cincinnati, OH to Dayton, OH)
Montgomery Branch (Blue Ash, OH to Montgomery, OH)
Hempstead Branch (Hempstead to Clement)
Louisville Branch (Indianapolis, IN to Louisville, KY)
Madison Branch (Columbus, IN to Madison, IN)
Shelbyville Branch (Columbus, IN to Dublin Junction, IN)
New Albany Branch (Jeffersonville, IN to New Albany, IN)

Arbegust Street Branch (Louisville, KY)
Vincennes Branch (Indianapolis, IN to Vincennes, IN)

***Starch Works Branch (Indianapolis, IN)
Greene County Coal Branch (Bushrod, IN to Linton, IN)
Columbia Branch (Bicknell, IN)
Knox County Coal Branch (Bicknell, IN)
Vandalia Railroad (Indianapolis, IN to St. Louis, MO) 
St. Louis, Vandalia and Terre Haute Railroad (St. Louis, MO to Terre Haute, IN)
Terre Haute and Indianapolis Rail Road (Indianapolis, IN to Terre Haute, IN)
Terre Haute and Logansport Branch (Terre Haute, IN to Logansport, IN)
Logansport and Toledo Branch (Logansport, IN to Toledo, OH)
I&F Branch
Centerpoint Branch (Stearleys to Centerpoint)
Hadleytown Branch (Brazil to Hadleytown)
Saline City Branch (Brazil)
Willow Creek Branch (Staunton to Seelyville)
Furnace Branch (Brazil)
Glen Ayr Branch (Seelyville)
Crawfordsville Branch (Terre Haute to Frankfort)
Macksville North Branch (West Terre Haute)
Macksville South Branch (West Terre Haute)
Peoria Branch (Farrington to Peoria)
Highland Mill Branch (Highland)
Troy Branch (Collinsville to Troy)
Stock Yards Branch (East St. Louis, IL)

Columbus to Chicago
Main Line (Columbus, OH to Chicago, IL)
Main Line (Columbus to Indianapolis via Bradford) (Bradford, OH to New Paris, OH)
Muncie Branch (Converse, IN to Muncie, IN)
South Bend Branch (Logansport, IN to South Bend, IN)
Butler Branch (Logansport, IN to Butler, IN)

Effner Branch (Kenneth, IN to Effner, IL)
Englewood Connecting Railway Branch (Chicago, IL)

See also
List of Pennsylvania Railroad lines east of Pittsburgh

References

Pennsylvania Railroad, Form CT1000, List of Stations and Sidings and Instructions for Making Reports to the Superintendent Car Service